Vrba is one of ten villages in the Municipality of Žirovnica in the Upper Carniolan region of Slovenia. It was first mentioned in written sources from 1247 and is a typical example of a compact Alpine village. According to the 2002 census, it has a population of 196. The Slovene national poet France Prešeren, who was born in the village, dedicated it the sonnet "O Vrba", the first of his Sonnets of Misfortune.

History

In 1940, the Prešeren House and the village were filmed for the black and white sound documentary O, Vrba. Due to the communist-imposed ban on artistic productions, it was released only in 1945. The house was presented by Finžgar, whereas Oton Župančič read the poem "O Vrba". Due to the news about the German assault on Poland the film has a threatening atmosphere created by clouds moving over the Karawanks mountain range.

Mass grave
Vrba is the site of a mass grave associated with the Second World War. The Bele Linden Mass Grave is located in a meadow south of the settlement and west of the freeway, near a hayrack along a field road. It contains the remains of 20 people from Jesenice that were killed en route from Jesenice to Begunje na Gorenjskem.

Church

St. Mark's Church stands on the outskirts of the village behind the Prešeren House. It has Romanesque foundations, but the actual structure is Gothic with an interesting apse, extensive Gothic frescoes from the 15th and early 16th century on the interior walls, a renovated wooden ceiling, and two gilded Baroque altars. On the outside wall there are also relatively well-preserved frescoes of St. Christopher, the Crucifixion, and St. George fighting the dragon from the 15th century.

Other landmarks
The Prešeren House, where France Prešeren and Archbishop Anton Vovk were born, is a typical example of a rural residence from the first half of the 19th century and has been in 1939 on the initiative and under the leadership of the writer Fran Saleški Finžgar arranged as a museum, dedicated to Prešeren's life and work. The museum was opened in May that year.

The linden tree, around which there are sixteen stones, in the center of the village was the meeting place of the elders of the village, who would traditionally meet under this tree to discuss village issues.

In January 2011, the Prešeren House, St. Mark's Church, and the linden tree were proclaimed cultural monuments of national importance by the Government of Slovenia.

Notable people
Notable people that were born or lived in Vrba include:
Janez Zlatoust Pogačar, Bishop of Ljubljana (1875–1884)
France Prešeren (1800–1849), poet
Anton Vovk (1900–1963), archbishop of Ljubljana

References

Populated places in the Municipality of Žirovnica
France Prešeren
Villages in Slovenia